The General Archive of Simancas (also known by its acronym, AGS) is an official archive located in the Castle of Simancas, in the town of Simancas, province of Valladolid, Castile and León, Spain. It was founded in 1540, making this the first official archive of the Crown of Castile.

The chronological evolution of the institution has been influenced by the history of the Crown of Castile. The moments of strength or weakness of the Spanish monarchy have been reflected in the regularity of documents' arrivals or conversely in the shortages of resources. A major milestone occurred in 1588, when Philip II of Spain issued the charter of the Archives of Simancas, a key document for understanding the management of both this archive and others in the peninsula. Also, the damage suffered during the Spanish War of Independence (the Peninsular War) had a major impact on the institution.

Currently, the AGS is a cultural institution funded by the Ministry of Culture of Spain dedicated to conservation, cataloging and research. These activities have brought about the reputation of the archive as one of the cornerstones of the Iberian Peninsula in its preservation and custody of documents.

UNESCO awarded the General Archive of Simancas with the distinction of World Heritage Site in 2017 within its category Memory of the World Programme.

Location 

The archive was placed in Simancas, a town some 10 km away from Valladolid. The place was not chosen randomly but was selected because it was well-fortified and easily defended.
During the period of the Reconquista, the village of Simancas was relevant as a frontier zone. Subsequently, its strategic location between the kingdoms of León and Castile gave it a political role in that period. After the conquest of Toledo and its territory in 1085 the town lost its importance, and in the  13th century was just one of many towns on the outskirts of Valladolid. However, it soon ceased to be part of the jurisdiction of Valladolid, because in 1465 King Henry IV of Castile ceded some powers to the city of Simancas to encourage it to remain faithful to him.

Until 1917, modern and contemporary historians dated Simancas castle to the time of the Reconquest. However, in that year Francisco Rodríguez Marín published a paper in which he stated that Simancas castle had been taken by Admiral Fadrique under Henry IV, and later was demolished and rebuilt by his son, Admiral Alonso Enriquez. Thus, the construction date of the current castle can be assigned between the years 1467 and 1480. The castle has been extensively renovated over the centuries, and few traces of its original structure remain.

Factors that led to the decision to choose the castle of Simancas as an archive include the fact that, after advancing the frontiers of Christian territory to southern territories, the castle no longer had a specific function in peacetime. That meant that it had other uses, from being a weapons cache to acting as a state prison, functions that were served at the same time as being an archive. There was also the  influence of Francisco de los Cobos, Comendador Mayor de León, a member of the Carlos I's Court who exerted all his influence in order to place the archive in Simancas.

The castle was not a place designed to house an archive, which means that there are some problems that have concerned archivists throughout history. The most important of these is the risk of fire. In the past, sharing archive space with a gaol increased the risk that the records might be reduced to ashes. Moreover, being a fortress, the building was a prime target in armed conflicts, such as the Spanish War of Independence of 1808-1814.

The building was not designed to keep documents nor for research, so the ornamentation was not intended to extol scholarship but rather royal power. For example, one of the doors of the AGS was decorated with the coat of arms of king Philip II. Furthermore, it has long been difficult to accommodate the researchers. Some improvements have been made over the years to address this trouble.

See also
 List of collections in the Archivo General de Simancas (in Spanish)

Further reading

External links

 
 
 

Archives in Spain
Province of Valladolid
Kingdom of Castile
Memory of the World Register in Spain